Sharpe's Tiger is the fifteenth (though first in chronological order) historical novel in the Richard Sharpe series by Bernard Cornwell and was first published in 1997.  It acts as a prequel to the "original" Sharpe series, which begins in 1809, while Sharpe is a captain in the Peninsular War during the Talavera Campaign in Spain.  In Tiger, Sharpe is a private in the 33rd Regiment of Foot, serving in southern India during the Siege of Seringapatam in 1799.

It is also the first of three novels (followed by Sharpe's Triumph and Sharpe's Fortress) chronicling Sharpe's army service in India. Two others (Sharpe's Trafalgar and Sharpe's Prey) take place before the Peninsular War.

Plot summary

Richard Sharpe is a private in the 33rd Regiment of Foot in the British army. The British invade Mysore and advance on Tippoo Sultan's capital city of Seringapatam. Sharpe is contemplating desertion with his paramour, half-caste army widow Mary Bickerstaff, due to his sadistic company sergeant, Obadiah Hakeswill. Hakeswill lusts after Mary, so he provokes Sharpe into hitting him before witnesses, company commander Captain Morris and Ensign Hicks. Sharpe is court-martialled; Lieutenant William Lawford, who is supposed to act as his defender, is absent and Sharpe is given the virtual death sentence of 2,000 lashes. However, the regiment's commander, Colonel Arthur Wellesley (later the Duke of Wellington), halts the punishment at 202 lashes. Lawford has been offered an extremely dangerous mission and has requested Sharpe. Sharpe agrees to go along if he is made a sergeant if they are successful.

Lawford and Sharpe pose as deserters to try to rescue Colonel Hector McCandless, Lawford's uncle and chief of the British East India Company's intelligence service. Sharpe's flogging inadvertently makes their cover story more plausible. Sharpe quickly takes charge and brings Mary along, to protect her from Hakeswill and because she speaks several of the native languages. They are soon captured by scouts from Tippoo's army and taken to Seringapatam where they meet Colonel Gudin, a French military adviser to Tippoo.  During their interrogation, the Tippoo enters and orders them to load muskets. He then orders Sharpe to shoot a British prisoner, Colonel McCandless; he does, having noticed that the "gunpowder" he has been given is fake. The musket does not fire. After covertly telling McCandless that he is a spy, he is told by McCandless that the British must not attack the seemingly weakest portion of the city walls. (It is later revealed that Tippoo has had mines buried there to blow up the British when they enter the trap.)

Lawford and Sharpe join Gudin's troops, while Mary is sent to work as a servant in the household of one of Tippoo's generals, Appah Rao, a Hindu who, unknown to the Muslim Tippoo, is considering switching sides. As they search for their contact, a merchant who can pass along the vital warning to the besieging British forces. Gudin tests the pair further, giving them rifled fowling guns (Sharpe's first exposure to a rifled weapon instead of a smoothbore musket).  Sharpe's shot is slightly high, but Lawford, to his mortification, ends up hitting a British scout.  

As a further test, Sharpe helps defend a Mysore encampment which is attacked by the British.  During the attack, Sharpe encounters Hakeswill and tries to kill him, but is stopped by Gudin, who wants prisoners.  Back in Seringapatam, Hakeswill spots Lawford in the crowd, but does not betray him (yet).  Sharpe is rewarded for his actions by Tippoo and is allowed to visit Mary.  He finds that she is attracted to one of Appah Rao's men, Kunwar Singh, news which Sharpe takes in good grace.  Meanwhile, Tippoo orders the prisoners executed by his personal bodyguard, the fearsome Jettis, but spares Hakeswill when the sergeant betrays Lawford and Sharpe. The two are captured and Sharpe is tortured until Lawford reveals their mission. Gudin then tells them that the spy they sought in the city had been killed weeks before and fed to Tippoo's pet tigers. They are then imprisoned with McCandless and Hakeswill.  During their imprisonment, Lawford teaches Sharpe to read and write.

After days of bombardment, the British finally breach the wall and prepare to attack.  With the assault imminent, Appah Rao orders Kunwar Singh to free McCandless, while Tippoo orders Sharpe, Lawford and McCandless executed as a sacrifice to ensure his victory.  Mary accompanies Singh and helps Sharpe escape. Sharpe, accompanied by Lawford, then sets the mine off prematurely. As a result, many of Tippoo's best soldiers are killed or stunned, and the British enter the breach in the walls. Rao decides to abandon Tippoo and withdraws his men. Sharpe returns to Hakeswill and throws him to Tippoo's tigers, though they inexplicably ignore him.  Sharpe then encounters Tippoo, who is trying to flee the city, kills him and loots his corpse.

The British capture the city and restore the Hindu rajah to the throne, as a British puppet ruler. Sharpe carefully takes no credit for killing Tippoo to avoid having to surrender the jewels he looted.

Characters
 Richard Sharpe – the protagonist; private in the British army serving in India, serving in the 33rd Regiment
 William Lawford – Sharpe's lieutenant who aids him in freeing Colonel McCandless 
 Mary Bickerstaff – a half-English, half-Indian army widow, who becomes Sharpe's lover
 General George Harris – commander of the British forces in India against the Tippoo of Mysore
 Major-General David Baird – a former prisoner within Seringapatam now itching for revenge
 Colonel Arthur Wellesley – later 1st Duke of Wellington, the officer who saves Sharpe from his virtual execution at the hands of Hakeswill
 Colonel Hector McCandless – Scottish intelligence officer for the British East India Company, held captive by the Tippoo Sultan in the dungeons of Seringapatam
 The Tippoo – the Muslim ruler who deposed (but did not kill) the Hindu sultan of Seringapatam
 Colonel Jean Gudin – a French adviser to the Tippoo
 Sergeant Obadiah Hakeswill – a sadistic, half-mad enemy of Sharpe's who believes he cannot be killed
 Brevet Lieutenant Fitzgerald – murdered by Hakeswill during a battle outside Seringapatam
 Ensign Hicks – a junior officer in the Light Company
 Captain Morris – the commanding officer of 33rd Light Company
 Major Shee – the commanding officer of the 33rd Regiment
 Colonel Gent – the officer in charge of engineering the breach
 General Appah Rao – the Hindu officer in the Tippoo's army; knows McCandless from having previously served with him

Publication history
1997, UK, HarperCollins , Pub date 2 June 1997, hardback
1997, UK, HarperCollins , Pub date 16 June 1997, audio cassette 
1997, USA, HarperCollins Publishers , Pub date ? October 1997, hardback
1997, UK, HarperCollins , Pub date 3 November 1997, paperback
1998, UK, HarperCollins , Pub date 1 June 1998, paperback
1999, USA, Chivers Press , Pub date 1 March 1999, hardback
2001, USA, Rebound by Sagebrush , Pub date ? October 2001, hardback (library)
2002, USA, Chivers Audio Books  , Pub date 16 June 1997, audio CD (unabridged William Gaminara narrator) 
2005, UK, HarperCollins , Pub date 15 June 2005, audio cassette (Sean Bean narrator) 
2006, UK, HarperCollins , Pub date 18 April 2006, paperback

External links
Section from Bernard Cornwell's website on Sharpe's Tiger
Read On-line

References 

1997 British novels
Tiger
Culture of Mysore
Fiction set in 1799
Novels set in Karnataka
HarperCollins books